Jane Hume Clapperton (22 September 1832 – 30 September 1914) was a British philosopher, birth control pioneer, socialist, social reformer and suffragist.

Life 

Her father was Alexander Clapperton (d. 1849) and mother Anne Clapperton (née Hume) (d. 1872). She had eleven siblings. Her father ran a company, Clapperton & Co., in Edinburgh and moved from 43 Lauriston Place close to George Heriot's School to 126 George Street in the year Jane was born. 

Her father was a Liberal minded business man who had his children home educated, although Jane was sent to an English boarding school when she was 12 years old due to her frail health.  Prior to her father's death, her brother John Clapperton took over the family firm (based at 371 High Street on the Royal Mile) and the fanily had moved to 128 Princes Street in a house facing Edinburgh Castle.

On returning home, she did charitable work whilst remaining a spinster at home with her mother after her father died and siblings married, and then became an active suffragist when she joined the Edinburgh Women's Suffrage Society in 1871, subscribed to the Women's Social and Political Union in 1907 and became a member of the Women's Freedom League in 1908.

In 1911 she is thought to be the "Miss Clapperton" living at 35 Drummond Place in the New Town of Edinburgh. She is buried in St Cuthberts Churchyard at the west end of Princes Street with her family. The grave lies in the raised area to the south-west of the church.

Her niece was the leading suffragette Lettice Floyd, known for her openly queer relationship with fellow suffragette Annie Williams. Clapperton's writing was on a philosophy of evolution of humanity and its happiness being related to ethical behaviour which she associated with full sexual freedom, and equality for women - in the home, the workplace and wider society and she advocated social inclusion and poverty eradication.

More specifically, Clapperton wrote that through controlling and differentiating the thoughts, feelings and senses people gain self knowledge and self discipline to meet the community's needs.

Publications 

 Scientific Meliorism and the Evolution of Happiness (1885)
 Margaret Dunmore: or a socialist home (1888)
A vision of the future : based on the application of ethical principles (1904)

References 

1832 births
1914 deaths
Writers from Edinburgh
British socialist feminists
Women's Social and Political Union